Afrogamasellus is a genus of mites in the family Rhodacaridae.

Species
These 24 species belong to the genus Afrogamasellus:

 Afrogamasellus celisi Loots, 1969
 Afrogamasellus congoensis (Ryke & Loots, 1966)
 Afrogamasellus evansi Loots, 1969
 Afrogamasellus franzi (Ryke & Loots, 1966)
 Afrogamasellus franzoides Hurlbutt, 1974
 Afrogamasellus isthmus Hurlbutt, 1974
 Afrogamasellus kahusiensis Loots, 1969
 Afrogamasellus kilimanjaroensis (Ryke & Loots, 1966)
 Afrogamasellus latigynia Hurlbutt, 1974
 Afrogamasellus lokelei Van Daele, 1976
 Afrogamasellus lootsi Hurlbutt, 1974
 Afrogamasellus luberoensis luberoensis Loots, 1968
 Afrogamasellus lyamunguensis Hurlbutt, 1974
 Afrogamasellus maskamensis (Ryke & Loots, 1966)
 Afrogamasellus mitigatus (Berlese, 1923)
 Afrogamasellus muhiensis Loots, 1969
 Afrogamasellus nyinabitabaensis Loots, 1969
 Afrogamasellus paratruncatus Hurlbutt, 1974
 Afrogamasellus quadrisigillatus (Berlese, 1916)
 Afrogamasellus rugegensis Loots, 1969
 Afrogamasellus tetrastigma (Berlese, 1916)
 Afrogamasellus truncatus Hurlbutt, 1974
 Afrogamasellus uluguruensis Hurlbutt, 1974
 Afrogamasellus uviraensis (Ryke & Loots, 1966)

References

Rhodacaridae